Dawlatzai are several Pashtun tribes in eastern and northern Afghanistan. Dawlatzais live in the Logar, Samangan, Paktia, Paktika, Khost, Baghlan, Nangarhar, Balkh Tajurghan, Faryab, and Kabul provinces of Afghanistan

References 

Pashtun tribes
Ethnic groups in Khost Province